Onur Tuncer (born February 19, 1984 in Kocaeli, Turkey) is a Turkish football player who last played for Yeni Malatyaspor.

Career 

He transferred from İstanbulspor and been a player for youth team of Fenerbahçe till 2004. Fenerbahçe decided to loan him for 2004–05 season to Sivasspor, for 2005–06 season to Antalyaspor and for 2006–07 season to Mardinspor.

References

External links 
 Official Fenerbahçe Youth Team Page

1984 births
Living people
Turkish footballers
Fenerbahçe S.K. footballers
Sivasspor footballers
Bucaspor footballers
Orduspor footballers
Antalyaspor footballers
Süper Lig players
TFF First League players

Association football midfielders